Stijn D'Hulst (born 24 April 1991) is a Belgian professional volleyball player. He is a member of the Belgium national team. At the professional club level, he plays for Knack Roeselare.

Honours

Clubs
 CEV Champions League
  2018/2019 – with Cucine Lube Civitanova

 FIVB Club World Championship
  Poland 2018 – with Cucine Lube Civitanova
  Betim 2019 – with Cucine Lube Civitanova

 National championships
 2010/2011  Belgian SuperCup, with Knack Roeselare
 2010/2011  Belgian Cup, with Knack Roeselare
 2012/2013  Belgian Cup, with Knack Roeselare
 2012/2013  Belgian Championship, with Knack Roeselare
 2013/2014  Belgian SuperCup, with Knack Roeselare
 2013/2014  Belgian Championship, with Knack Roeselare
 2014/2015  Belgian SuperCup, with Knack Roeselare
 2014/2015  Belgian Championship, with Knack Roeselare
 2015/2016  Belgian Cup, with Knack Roeselare
 2015/2016  Belgian Championship, with Knack Roeselare
 2016/2017  Belgian Cup, with Knack Roeselare
 2016/2017  Belgian Championship, with Knack Roeselare
 2018/2019  Italian Championship, with Cucine Lube Civitanova
 2019/2020  Italian Cup, with Cucine Lube Civitanova
 2021/2022  Belgian Championship, with Knack Roeselare
 2022/2023  Belgian Cup, with Knack Roeselare

References

External links

 
 Player profile at LegaVolley.it 
 Player profile at Volleybox.net

1991 births
Living people
Sportspeople from Kortrijk
Belgian men's volleyball players
Belgian expatriate sportspeople in Germany
Expatriate volleyball players in Germany
Belgian expatriate sportspeople in Italy
Expatriate volleyball players in Italy
Setters (volleyball)